The Episcopal Diocese of Kansas, established in 1859, is the diocese of the Episcopal Church in the United States of America with jurisdiction over eastern Kansas. It is in Province 7 and its cathedral, Grace Cathedral, is in Topeka, as are the diocesan offices.

Current bishop
The Right Reverend Cathleen Chittenden Bascom is the 10th bishop of Kansas. She was elected in 2018 and ordained and consecrated bishop on March 2, 2019.

Bishops serving areas including the Kansas Territory 

Jackson Kemper, (1789–1870), Missionary, Missouri-Kansas (1837–1859)

Henry Washington Lee, Missionary, Iowa - Kansas (1860–1864)

History of the Territorial Area 

The first Episcopal services in the Kansas Territory were conducted in 1837 by Bishop Jackson Kemper. In 1859 Bishop Kemper agreed to a convention, at which seven clergy and 11 laymen voted to form the Episcopal Diocese of Kansas. At that time the diocese was contiguous with the boundaries of the Kansas Territory.  Bishop Henry Washington Lee of Iowa, served as provisional bishop of Kansas from 1860 to 1864. During this time the state of Kansas was established by Congress, and the boundaries of the diocese shrunk to conform to those of the state, by action of General Convention in 1862.

During the territorial era, the diocese formed the College of the Sisters of Bethany, an Episcopal girls school that closed in 1928.

List of bishops
The bishops of Kansas have been:

 Thomas H. Vail (1864–1889)
 Elisha Smith Thomas (1889–1895)
 Frank Millspaugh, (1895–1916)
 James Wise, (1916–1939)
 Goodrich R. Fenner (1939-1959)
 Edward Clark Turner (1959–1981)
 Richard F. Grein (1981–1988)
 William E. Smalley (1989–2003)
 Dean E. Wolfe (2004–2017)
 Cathleen Chittenden Bascom (2019–Present)

History of the Diocese 

In 1864, 26 delegates from 10 organized parishes gathered at diocesan convention and elected the diocese’s first bishop, Thomas Hubbard Vail. Bishop Vail established a hospital in Topeka, Christ Hospital (the successor to that institution, Stormont-Vail Regional Medical Center, still bears his name). At the end of his episcopacy, the diocese had expanded to 138 congregations, more than 3,000 communicants and 31 clergy, plus three schools and the hospital.

The Missionary District of Salina was created from the Diocese in 1901. Its territory extends over the western 60 percent of the state and now is known as the Diocese of Western Kansas.

In June 1879, Grace Church of Topeka was designated the Cathedral of the diocese. In 1910 the foundation for the current Cathedral building was laid. By 1912, the walls had been erected but funds were depleted and further construction was halted. Fund raising efforts and leadership from Bishop Frank Millspaugh and the Rev. J. P. DeBevers Kaye, money was raised for completion of the Cathedral, with exception of the towers, in 1917.

Churches
 

St. Andrew's Episcopal Church, Emporia

See also

 List of Succession of Bishops for the Episcopal Church, USA

References

External links
Episcopal Diocese of Kansas website
 Diocese of Kansas history
 Grace Cathedral website
Official Web site of the Episcopal Church
Journal of the Annual Convention, Diocese of Kansas

Kansas
Episcopal Church in Kansas
Religious organizations established in 1859
Anglican dioceses established in the 19th century
1859 establishments in Kansas Territory
Province 7 of the Episcopal Church (United States)